Volotea  (stylised VOLOTEΛ) is a Spanish low-cost airline registered in Castrillón, Asturias, Spain, with bases in Spain, Italy, France and Greece.

History

Volotea was established by Alaeo S.L. from Barcelona, a company created by former Vueling founders, Carlos Muñoz and Lázaro Ros. The name "Volotea" originates from the Spanish verb "revolotear," meaning "to fly around." It commenced operations on 5 April 2012, from Venice Marco Polo Airport.

The company is backed by three private-equity funds, two of them from Europe (Axis Participaciones Empresariales and Corpfin Capital) and a third from the United States (CCMP Capital), whose chairman, Greg Brenneman, was one-time President and COO of the US airline Continental Airlines, and also chairs Volotea's board. The company raised over €50m before operations began.
US CCMP Capital Partners holds 49% of voting rights; Axis and Corpfin Capital 25%; and Muñoz and Ros 26% along with relatives: this ownership has existed since foundation, but it could change before an initial public offering before 2021-2022.

After studying the Bombardier CRJ1000 and the Embraer E-195 in 2011, Volotea selected the Boeing 717 after Southwest Airlines acquired AirTran and replaced its 717 fleet. Boeing announced on 15 February 2012 that it had signed a long-term lease deal with Volotea for an undisclosed number of Boeing 717 aircraft. In March 2015, it was announced that Volotea would receive a further four 717s from Blue1. However, in November 2015, Volotea announced plans to phase out its 717 fleet over the next few years and replace it with Airbus A320 family aircraft.

Volotea opened 90 routes in its first year, of which 40 were closed within two years; it operated almost 300 routes in summer 2018 including 220 openings, and this could double to at least 500-600 across Europe.
Volotea has been profitable since 2014, a turnover of €360 million ($431 million) is expected in 2018 after $347M in 2017, carrying 5.7 to 6 million passengers, 50% being leisure travellers, 35% visiting friends and relatives, and 15% business travellers.

Due to the 2017–18 Spanish constitutional crisis, in 2017 Volotea changed the headquarters to Asturias Airport, Castrillon, Asturias, Spain. As of June 2018, the airline has carried 18 million passengers since beginning operations in 2012.

In January 2021, Volotea retired the last of their 19 Boeing 717-200s. They were the last European airline to operate the type.

On October 15, 2021, Volotea won the auction for handling the PSOs, for a period of 7 months, to and from the island of Sardinia, organised by the Autonomous Region of Sardinia on behalf of the Italian Government. The airline operated the PSO services by offering daily flights, as per what required by the auction, from the Sardinian airports of Cagliari-Elmas, Olbia-Costa Smeralda and Alghero-Fertilia to the Italian airports of Rome Fiumicino and Milan Linate. The PSO operations started on October 15th, 2021 and are to end on May 15th, 2022.

In January 2022, Volotea announced the closure of their base at Genoa Airport after five years, ending 14 routes.

Just before the planned end of Volotea's PSO operations in Sardinia, the company confirmed, in March 2022, its intention to take part in the upcoming PSO auction, which had been previously announced by the Autonomous Region of Sardinia, solely with the route from Cagliari-Elmas to Rome Fiumicino airport, being it the most profitable service within the PSO scheme, while data regarding the other routes was being analysed as they were also being taken into consideration. Subsequently, at the end of the month, ITA Airways announced their willingness to operate PSO service routes from all Sardinian airports without any financial compensations for an year until May 2023. As a result Volotea, on March 28, 2022, announced they were also interested in covering all PSO routes, without financial compensations, from both Cagliari-Elmas and Olbia-Costa Smeralda airports, after having analysed data from their previous PSO experience. In April 2022, Carlos Muñoz, the CEO of the company, eventually announced Volotea had reached an agreement with Ita Airways, according to which the airline will operate only half of the frequencies, while the remaining ones would be assigned to the counterpart.

Destinations

The focus of Volotea's route network is on destinations around the European side of the Mediterranean coast as well as Western and Southern Europe. As of May 2018, Volotea serves metropolitan and leisure destinations mainly in Spain, France, Italy and Greece with destinations in Austria, Croatia, Czechia, Germany, Ireland, Luxembourg, and Portugal. Volotea served its first African destination (Tangier, Morocco) on 5 April 2019.

Fleet

Current fleet
As of September 2022, the Volotea fleet consists of the following aircraft:

Historical fleet

References

External links

Official website

Airlines of Spain
Airlines established in 2011
Airlines for Europe
Spanish companies established in 2011
Low-cost carriers
Spanish brands
Companies based in Asturias
European Low Fares Airline Association